Matti Mäki (born March 17, 1982 in Oulu) is a male backstroke swimmer from Finland. He competed for his native country at the 2004 Summer Olympics in Athens, Greece.

References
sports-reference

1982 births
Living people
Finnish male backstroke swimmers
Swimmers at the 2004 Summer Olympics
Olympic swimmers of Finland
Sportspeople from Oulu